Thomas (Tom) Smith (born 17 May 1958) is an Australian finance academic. He has been ranked as the number one finance academic in Australia and New Zealand by both the Journal of Financial Literature and the Pacific Basin Finance Journal.

Biography 
Smith's Current research includes work on environmental finance, stock volatility, market microstructure and dividend policy. Earlier interests are in the areas of asset pricing theory and tests, the design of markets, and derivatives. His research has been published in the leading financial economic journals, including the Journal of Finance, Review of Financial Studies, Journal of Financial Economics, Journal of Accounting Research, Journal of Business, Journal of Law and Economics  and the Journal of Financial and Quantitative Analysis.

Prior appointments were at the University of Queensland (2012-2017), Australia National University (2003-2011), Australian Graduate School of Management (1995–2002) and Duke University (1988–1995). At UQ Business School, he held the Frank Finn Chair in Finance.

He completed his PhD studies at Stanford Graduate School of Business, after undergraduate and postgraduate studies at the University of Queensland  — Bachelor of Commerce (Honours), 1980; Masters in Financial Management, 1982 — where he was the recipient of numerous academic and merit awards.

References 

 Tom Smith at University of Queensland
SSRN Author Page

Academic staff of the Australian National University
Australian economists
Duke University faculty
Stanford Graduate School of Business alumni
1958 births
Living people
Financial economists